
Gmina Sypniewo is a rural gmina (administrative district) in Maków County, Masovian Voivodeship, in east-central Poland. Its seat is the village of Sypniewo, which lies approximately 21 kilometres (13 mi) north-east of Maków Mazowiecki and 89 km (55 mi) north-east of Warsaw.

Villages
Gmina Sypniewo contains the villages and settlements of Batogowo, Biedrzyce-Koziegłowy, Biedrzyce-Stara Wieś, Boruty, Chełchy, Chojnowo, Dylewo, Gąsewo Poduchowne, Glącka, Glinki-Rafały, Jarzyły, Majki-Tykiewki, Mamino, Nowe Gąsewo, Nowy Szczeglin, Olki, Poświętne, Rawy, Rzechówek, Rzechowo Wielkie, Rzechowo-Gać, Sławkowo, Stare Glinki, Strzemieczne-Sędki, Sypniewo, Szczeglin Poduchowny, Zalesie, Zamość and Ziemaki.

Neighbouring gminas
Gmina Sypniewo is bordered by the gminas of Czerwonka, Krasnosielc, Młynarze, Olszewo-Borki and Płoniawy-Bramura.

References

External links
Polish official population figures 2006

Sypniewo
Maków County